THAI Smile Airways is a Thai regional airline and a wholly owned subsidiary of Thai Airways International headquartered in Bangkok.

History 
On 20 May 2011, the Thai Airways board announced plans to create a new lower-cost airline, at the time dubbed Thai Wings. The creation of the airline was announced by Ampon Kittiampon, the chairman of Thai's board of directors, on 19 August 2011. It is planned to begin operations in July 2012. According to Ampon, THAI Smile is intended to serve the market gap between low-cost carriers and full service airlines.  The name THAI Smile was chosen from a pool of 2,229 entries in a contest to name the airline. According to an official at Thai Airways, THAI Smile is planned to begin showing an annual profit of about five million baht within two years of the start of operations.

In 2020, THAI Smile established a partnership with USA based Optiontown to run a prepaid flight subscription platform called Flight Pass, which enables customers to pre-purchase THAI Smile flights to one or more destinations at the best available price and decide when they want to travel at a later date.

In February 2023, it has been announced that Thai Smile will be dissolved as a separate entity and merged into parent Thai Airways by 2024 in an effort to reduce losses.

Destinations 
 THAI Smile flies to 16 destinations in Thailand and 19 destinations in Cambodia, China, Taiwan, Laos, Malaysia, Myanmar, India and Vietnam.

Fleet 

As of 1 November 2021, THAI Smile's fleet consists of the following aircraft:

Sponsorship
Thai Smile Airways is currently an official sponsor of Thai Honda Ladkrabang and Ratchaburi Mitr Phol.

References

External links 

 

Airlines of Thailand
Airlines established in 2011
Thai Airways International
Thai companies established in 2011
Star Alliance